Holly A. Taylor is an American psychologist.

Bography
She is a professor of psychology at Tufts University School of Arts and Sciences. She joined the university in 1994. Her research focuses on the mental representation of information, She also researches spatial cognition and comprehension. She collaborates with Robin Kanarek on the nutritional impacts on cognitive behavior. She completed a B.A. in mathematics and a minor in psychology at Dartmouth College in 1987. Taylor earned a Ph.D. in cognitive psychology from Stanford University in 1992.

References

External links 

 

Living people
Year of birth missing (living people)
Place of birth missing (living people)
Tufts University faculty
Stanford University alumni
Dartmouth College alumni
21st-century American scientists
21st-century American psychologists
20th-century American women scientists
21st-century American women scientists
American women psychologists
20th-century American psychologists
American women academics